John David Lobue is an American television director best known for his work on Soul Train, Soap, Newhart, It's a Living, Dharma & Greg, Two and a Half Men, and other television series. Lobue purchased a Studio City residence in Los Angeles from local modernist architect Michael Pearce and lived there for 2 years before selling it to Dennis Miller in 1988.

References

External links

1942 births
American television directors
Living people
People from Hammond, Louisiana
University of Mississippi alumni